The 2008 Northern Arizona Lumberjacks football team was an American football team that represented Northern Arizona University (NAU) as a member of the Big Sky Conference (Big Sky) during the 2008 NCAA Division I FCS football season. In their eleventh year under head coach Jerome Souers, the Lumberjacks compiled a 6–5 record (4–4 against conference opponents), outscored opponents by a total of 316 to 273, and finished fifth out of nine teams in the Big Sky.

On September 6, the team set a school record with 752 yards of total offense against New Mexico Highlands.

The team played its home games at the J. Lawrence Walkup Skydome, commonly known as the Walkup Skydome, in Flagstaff, Arizona.

Schedule

References

Northern Arizona
Northern Arizona Lumberjacks football seasons
Northern Arizona Lumberjacks football